Aleksandr Mikhailovich Samokutyaev (born 13 March 1970 in Penza, Russian SFSR, USSR) is a Russian politician and former cosmonaut. Samokutyaev served as a Flight Engineer for the International Space Station (ISS) long duration Expedition 27/28 missions. He also  served as the Soyuz TMA-21 commander. He most recently served on the Soyuz TMA-14M Expedition 41/42 crew aboard the ISS. He was hired as a cosmonaut in the summer of 2003.

Since 2020, he has represented the Lermontovsky constituency in the State Duma.

Education
In 1987–1988 Aleksandr studied at Penza Polytechnical Institute. Then he went to Chernigov and graduated from Chernigov Higher Military Pilot School after Lenin's Komsomol (HMPS) in 1992. Samokutyayev graduated from the Gagarin Air Force Academy as a pilot-engineer in 2000.

Experience
Samokutyayev has flown as pilot, senior pilot and deputy commander of air squadron, logging 680 hours of flight time and performed 250 parachute jumps. He is a qualified diver.

Upon graduation from the Gagarin Air Force Academy since 2000 he served at the Gagarin Cosmonaut Training Center as the planning division head.

Cosmonaut career
On 29 May 2003 he was enlisted in the cosmonaut detachment to pass a course of general space training. prior to the enlistment, on 20 January 2003 he successfully received a positive medical confirmation by the Chief Medical Board. Samokutyayev qualified as a test-cosmonaut on 5 July 2005.

In July 2008 Samokutyayev was assigned to the backup crew for Expedition 25 to the ISS. Since then he joined the ISS advanced training as a backup commander and, from 2009, as a flight engineer. During the launch of Soyuz TMA-18 on 2 April 2010 he served as a backup commander of the Soyuz spacecraft.

Expedition 27/28

In October 2008 Samokutyayev was assigned to the prime crew of the 27th long duration expedition to the space station. On 7 October 2009 his assignment was confirmed by NASA press release No. 09-233.

Samokutyayev flew into space for the first time as a Flight Engineer for the ISS long duration Expedition 27/28 missions. The Soyuz TMA-21 spacecraft carrying Samokutyayev, cosmonaut Andrei Borisenko and NASA astronaut Ron Garan launched on schedule from the Baikonur Cosmodrome's Gagarin's Start launch pad, at 23:18:20 UTC on 4 April 2011. Samokutyayev served as Commander of Soyuz TMA-21. The launch of Soyuz TMA-21 was devoted to the 50th anniversary of the first space mission by Yuri Gagarin. Samokutyayev carried a small stuffed dog given to him by his daughter. Hanging in front of the crew, live NASA TV launch footage showed that the dog begun to float as the spacecraft soared skywards, an indication of the weightlessness of space.

After two days of solo flight, the Soyuz TMA-21 spacecraft docked with the International Space Station (ISS) on 6 April at 23:09 UTC.

Samokutyayev concluded his 164-day stay aboard the Space Station, when his spaceship, Soyuz TMA-21 undocked from the Russian segment's Poisk module at 00:38 UTC on 16 September. On the same day, the Soyuz TMA-21 capsule carrying Samokutyayev, Borisenko and Ron Garan touched down (3:59:39 UTC) at 93 miles southeast of the city of Zhezkazgan in Kazakhstan.

Expedition 41/42
Samokutyayev returned to space aboard Soyuz TMA-14M, as part of the Expedition 41/42 long-duration International Space Station crew. The mission launched on 25 September 2014 and docked with the ISS just under six hours after lift-off on 26 September. He remained aboard the ISS until March 2015, when Soyuz TMA-14M returned to Earth as scheduled.

Spacewalks

Russian EVA #28
On 3 August 2011 Samokutyayev participated in his first spacewalk. He and cosmonaut Sergey Volkov worked for six hours and 23 minutes performing a variety of tasks for both science and maintenance outside the Russian segment of the ISS. Outside the Zvezda Service Module, Samokutyayev and Volkov installed laser communications equipment. They also, photographed an antenna with signs of degraded performance. After ground controllers took time to work on an antenna problem, the two cosmonauts also deployed a small satellite named Radioskaf-V which was originally planned for deployment at the beginning of the spacewalk. The satellite contained an amateur radio transmitter and a student experiment. The primary task of the spacewalk the relocation of the Strela 1 boom from the Pirs module to the Poisk module, had to be called off due to time constraints. The cosmonauts removed an antenna that helped guide the Poisk  module to a docking in November 2009 and was returned to the ISS at the end of the spacewalk. They also successfully installed the materials science experiment – BIORISK on a handrail outside the Pirs module. BIORISK experiment studies the effect of microbes on spacecraft structures and whether solar activity affects microbial growth. Finally, Samokutyayev and Volkov took more photographs holding photos of the first cosmonaut Yuri Gagarin, spacecraft designer Sergei Korolyov and Soviet astronautic theory pioneer Konstantin Tsiolkovsky with Earth in the background before entering the Pirs module, closing the hatch and completing the Russian EVA #28.

Russian EVA #40 
Samokutyaev and cosmonaut Maksim Surayev performed a spacewalk outside the space station on 22 October 2014. Although planned as a six-hour spacewalk, the cosmonauts were able to complete all the scheduled tasks in 3 hours and 38 minutes. During the extravehicular activity, Samokutyaev and Surayev dismantled the RK 21-8 Radiometria science payload and the 2ASF1-1 and 2ASF1-2 KURS antennas from the Poisk module. The RK-21-8 science payload was installed aboard the Space Station during the Russian EVA-28 in early 2011 and consisted of an antenna system with calibrator, a Microwave Radiometer receiver system and a Command-Information Unit. It was used for a series of seismic forecast and earthquake studies. The RK-21-8 payload was jettisoned by Surayev 33 minutes into the EVA on a safe departure trajectory from the Space Station. Samokutyaev jettisoned the antennas – the first being jettisoned at 15:43 UTC followed five minutes later by the second antenna. Samokutyaev and Surayev also released a protective cover from the EXPOSE-R payload developed by the European Space Agency to conduct astrobiology studies by exposing samples and experiments to the space environment. When the cosmonauts finished operations at the Poisk module, they photographed the surface of the orbital station for specialists to assess its condition later. Russian EVA-40 was the 184th spacewalk in support of the Space Station assembly.

In April 2017 Roscosmos decided to release Alexander Samokutyaev from his post on medical indicators.

Personal
Samokutyayev is married to Oksana Nikolaevna Samokutyaeva. They have one daughter named Anastasiya Alexandrovna Samokutyaeva.

Awards
Samokutyayev has received various Russian Armed Force medals.

References

External links

Spacefacts biography of Aleksandr Samokutyayev
on Astronaut.ru

1970 births
Living people
Russian cosmonauts
People from Penza
Crew members of the International Space Station
Heroes of the Russian Federation
Spacewalkers
Seventh convocation members of the State Duma (Russian Federation)
Eighth convocation members of the State Duma (Russian Federation)
United Russia politicians